Cedar Grove, also known as Ridgely's Whim or Sunday's Chance, is a historic home located at Baltimore, Maryland, United States. It is a large -story, side-passage, double-pile plan house constructed  about 1841. A -story wing incorporates an earlier structure, built between 1799 and 1813.

Cedar Grove was listed on the National Register of Historic Places in 1996.

References

External links
, including photo from 1996, at Maryland Historical Trust

Evergreen, Baltimore
Houses on the National Register of Historic Places in Baltimore
Federal architecture in Maryland
Greek Revival architecture in Maryland
Houses in Baltimore
Houses completed in 1841